This article shows all participating team squads at the 2010 FIVB Women's Club World Championship, held from December 15 to 21, 2010 in Doha, Qatar.

Volley Bergamo
 Head Coach:  Davide Mazzanti

Federbrau
 Head Coach:  Kiattipong Radchatagriengkai
 Assistant coach:  Nataphon Srisamutnak

Fenerbahçe Acıbadem
Coach:  Zé Roberto

Mirador
Head Coach:  Marcos Kwiek

References 

C
C